Adamski or Adamskiy  (masculine), Adamskaya (feminine) is a Russian-language surname, a variant of the Polish surname Adamski. Notable people with this surname include:

Viktor Adamsky (1923-2005), Soviet physicist

Russian-language surnames
Surnames of Polish origin